Issam Awarke (born 12 May 1960) is a Lebanese wrestler. He competed in the men's Greco-Roman 74 kg at the 1984 Summer Olympics.

References

External links
 

1960 births
Living people
Lebanese male sport wrestlers
Olympic wrestlers of Lebanon
Wrestlers at the 1984 Summer Olympics
Place of birth missing (living people)